The Tour de Tochigi is a road cycling race held annually since 2017. It is part of UCI Asia Tour in category 2.2.

Winners

References

External links
 

Cycle races in Japan
UCI Asia Tour races
Recurring sporting events established in 2017